Walloon railway station is located on the Main line in Queensland, Australia. It serves the Ipswich suburb of Walloon. It was formally opened on 31 July 1865 at the same time as the line.

Services
Walloon is served by City network services from Rosewood to Ipswich. Most services terminate at Ipswich although some peak-hour services continue to Bowen Hills and Caboolture.

Services by platform

References

External links

Walloon station Queensland Rail
Walloon station Queensland's Railways on the Internet
[ Walloon station] TransLink travel information

Walloon, Queensland
Railway stations in Australia opened in 1865
Railway stations in Ipswich City
Main Line railway, Queensland